This is a list of chess variants. Many thousands of variants exist. The 2007 catalogue The Encyclopedia of Chess Variants estimates that there are well over 2,000, and many more were considered too trivial for inclusion in the catalogue.

Chess-derived games

These chess variants are derived from chess by changing the board, board setup, pieces, or rules.

Standard rules and standard piece types
Many variants employ standard chess rules and mechanics, but vary the starting position of the pieces or number of pieces.

Standard rules, standard piece types, variant board

In these variants, the same pieces and rules as in chess are used, but the board is different; It can be smaller or larger, the shape of either the board or individual spaces can be non-square or modular, or it can even be extra-dimensional or unbounded. The movement of pieces in some variants is modified in concurrence with the geometry of the gameboard.
 Active Chess: Played on a 9×8 board, adding a queen with an extra pawn in front. Invented by G. Kuzmichov (1989), whose students tested the game, deciding that the optimal starting position was to place the second queen on the eighth or ninth files.
 Balbo's Game: A novel-shaped board with 70 squares. Full armies for each player, minus one pawn. No castling. By G. Balbo (1974).
 Chess on a 12 by 12 board: Played on a 12×12 board. Pawns promote on the third and tenth ranks. By D. Vogel (2000).
 Circular chess: Played on a circular board consisting of four rings, each of sixteen squares.
 Cross chess: Cross-shaped cells, board geometry like hex chess but moves akin to normal chess (e.g. bishops have four directions, not six; queens eight, not twelve). Extra rook, knight, and pawn per side. By George Dekle Sr.
 Cylinder chess: Played on a cylinder board with a- and h-files "connected". Thus a player can use them as if the a-file were next to the h-file (and vice versa).
 Decimal Chess: Played on a 10×10 board, usually add extra pieces. Some decimal chesses use only standard pieces, but others such as Decimal Falcon-Hunter Chess use fairy pieces.
 Decimal Rettah chess: Adding a king, queen and two pawns. Invented by V. R. Parton. 

 Double Chess: Two full armies per side on a 12×16 board, the first to mate an enemy king wins. Pawns advance up to four steps on their first move. Capablanca found the game "remarkably interesting". Invented by Julian Hayward (1916).
 Doublewide chess: Two regular chessboards are connected for a 16×8 play surface. Each player plays with two complete sets of chess pieces.
 Flying chess: Played on a board of 8×8×2, giving a total of 128 cells. Only certain pieces can move to and from the additional level.
 Grid chess: The board is overlaid with a grid of lines. For a move to be legal, it must cross at least one of these lines.
 Infinite chess: Numerous players and mathematicians have conceived of chess variations played on an unbounded chessboard. In one example, when using "Converse's rules," the pieces and their relative starting positions are unchanged—only the board is infinitely large.
 Los Alamos chess (or Anti-Clerical chess): Played on a 6×6 board without bishops. This was the first chess-like game played by a computer program.
 Masonic Chess: Every other board rank is indented. Same as chess, with moves adapted to the new brickwork-like board. By George Dekle Sr.
 Minichess: A family of variants played with regular chess pieces and standard rules, but on a smaller board.
 Polgar reform chess: In his book Reform-Chess (1997), László Polgár proposed several variants played on board of size 5×8, 6×8, 8×6, or 9×6. The initial piece setup is determined by players in the same way as in Benko's Pre-chess. There are special rules for castling depending on the board. Polgár recommended these variants to train creativity and to speed up the game.
 Polgar Superstar Chess: Hexagonal variant played on a special star-shaped board. Invented by László Polgár (2002).
 Rhombic Chess: Uses a hex-shaped board comprising 72 rhombus cells. Normal set of chess pieces move edgewise or pointwise. Checkmate objective as usual. By Tony Paletta (1980). 
 Spherical chess: A family of variants played on a chessboard wrapped around a sphere. The a- and h-files are adjacent. The poles are circular or octagonal and may or may not be occupied according to the variant. There are no board edges, so kings always have eight adjacent squares. Trans-polar diagonal moves mostly differentiate between variants.

Different starting position
These variants use standard boards and pieces, but the pieces start on nontraditional squares. In most such variants, the pawns are placed on their usual squares, but the position of other pieces is either randomly determined or selected by the players. The motivation for these variants is usually to nullify established opening knowledge. The downside of these variants is that the initial position usually has less harmony and balance than the standard chess position.

 Fischer Random Chess (or Chess960): The placement of the pieces on the first rank is randomized; although there are rules such as the 2 starting Bishops have to be on different colour squares, and the King has to start between the 2 Rooks. The opponent's pieces mirror it. Invented by Bobby Fischer (1996).
 Displacement chess: Some pieces in the initial position are exchanged but the rules remain exactly the same. Some examples of this may be that the king and queen are flipped, or the knight on the b-file is traded with the bishop on the f-file.
 Pre-chess: The game starts with white and black pawns set as usual, but the initial position of other pieces is selected by the players. White first places one of their pieces on their first rank, and then Black does the same. Players continue to alternate in this manner until all pieces have been placed, with the only restriction being that bishops must be on opposite-colour squares. The game then proceeds in the usual way. Proposed by Pal Benko in 1978.
 Transcendental Chess: Similar to Chess960, but the opening white and black positions do not mirror each other.
 Upside-down chess: The white and black pieces are switched so that White's pieces are on the 8th rank, with pawns on the 7th rank, one step away from promotion. The starting position looks like a standard chess starting position, but from the other player's perspective. As the pawns are blocked by pieces in the starting position, the game always starts with a knight move, and smothered mates are common.

Different number of pieces
These variants use standard chess pieces on a standard board, but players begin with unorthodox numbers of pieces. For example, starting with multiple queens or fewer pawns. Many such games use unbalanced starting positions, with one player having more or fewer of particular pieces than the other player.
 Charge of the Light Brigade: Apart from the usual king and pawns, one side has three queens and the other has seven knights.
 Dunsany's Chess (and the similar Horde chess): One side has standard chess pieces, and the other side has 32 pawns.
 Endgame chess (or The Pawns Game): Players start the game with only pawns and a king. Normal check, checkmate, en passant, and pawn promotion rules apply.
 Handicap chess (or Chess with odds): Variations to equalise chances of players with different strength.
 Peasants' Revolt: White has a king and eight pawns (the peasants) against Black's king, pawn, and four knights (the nobles). Black has the advantage. To narrow the contest, the game has also been played with three knights (on b8, c8, and g8) instead of four. By R. L. Frey (1947).
 Sixteen Pawns: White plays without their queen, but chooses where on the third and fourth ranks to place eight extra pawns. By Legall de Kermeur (18th century). Alexandre Deschapelles and Louis-Charles Mahé de La Bourdonnais later established that eight extra pawns favour White too much, and hence played the game with only five, six, or seven extra pawns for White instead.
 Really Bad Chess: A mobile video game by Zach Gage; Each player has one king and fifteen other pieces selected at random. 
 Weak!: White has the usual pieces, Black has one king, seven knights, and sixteen pawns. This game was played at a Columbia University chess club in the 1960s.

Variant rules and standard piece types
These variants introduce changes in the mechanics of the game, such as movement of pieces, rules for capturing, or winning conditions, using standard chess pieces.

Variant rules, variant set of standard piece types, variant board

These use standard pieces, but the quantity of one or more types of piece from a standard set is non-standard.

 Alice Chess: Played with two boards: a piece moved on one board passes "through the looking glass" onto the other board. By V. R. Parton (1953).
 Apocalypse: On a 5×5 board, each side has two knights and five pawns, win by eliminating all enemy pawns. Prepared moves are executed simultaneously. By C. S. Elliott (1976).
 Brusky's hexagonal chess: Chess on an irregular board of 84 hex cells. Same as Gliński's Hexagonal Chess, but with ten pawns instead of nine, linear startup, two forward move directions for pawns, pawns capture forward diagonally, and castling. By Yakov Brusky (1966).
 Chad: Kings are limited to 3×3 "castles" on a 12×12 board dominated by eight rooks per side which can promote to queens. By Christian Freeling (1979).
 Chessence: Nine pieces per player move according to their relative positions to each other on a 6×9 board with missing squares and kings immobile in the corners. By Jim Winslow (1989).
 Colour Chess: Played on a multicoloured board of six colours, with the order of turns taken as in Marseillais chess but with rules indicating which colour each piece may move to. The game is won by capturing the opponent's king (rather than checkmate) and kings may remain in check. Similar variants include Sequence Colour Chess, and Swarm Colour Chess.  By Tom Norfolk (2017).
 Congo: Kings (lions) are limited to 3×3 "castles" on a 7×7 board. By Demian Freeling (1982). 
 De Vasa's hexagonal chess: Chess on a rhombus-shaped board of 81 hex cells. Same as Gliński's Hexagonal Chess, but linear startup, two forward move directions for pawns, pawns capture forward diagonally to the side, and castling. Invented by Helge E. de Vasa (1953).
 Diplomat chess: Played on a circular board with 43 cells, including the centre circle which is considered orthogonal and diagonal to every adjacent cell. Includes a 'diplomat' piece which instead of capturing can suborn enemy pieces.
 Dragonfly: Played on a 7×7 or hex board, no queens, captured non-pawn pieces never die (à la Chessgi) and can be dropped on any open square. By Christian Freeling.
 Gliński's hexagonal chess: The most popular version of chess for the hex board. Includes three bishops, nine pawns, 91 hex cells. Invented by Władysław Gliński (1936).
 Hexagonal chess: A family of variants played on a hexgrid with three colours and three bishops.
 Hexapawn:  Played on a rectangular board of variable size with only pawns. The goal of each player is to advance one of their pawns to the opposite end of the board or to prevent the other player from moving.
 Jeson Mor: Nine knights per side on a 9×9 board. The first to occupy square e5, and then leave it, wins the game. From Mongolia. 
 McCooey's hexagonal chess: Chess on the same hexagonal board as Gliński's Hexagonal Chess, but using a different starting array, seven pawns instead of nine, and pawns capture forward diagonally. By Richard Honeycutt and David McCooey (1978–1979).
 Parallel Worlds Chess: A 3D variant using three boards, each player commands two armies, capturing either enemy king wins. The middle board is a sort of "twilight zone" obeying its own rules. By R. Wayne Schmittberger (1980s).
 Regimental Chess: This variant is played on 1-6 adjacent 12×16 boards, with one white and black division for each board signified by accent colours. Each division starts with 14 infantrymen, similar to pawns but only moving one space at a time straight or diagonally forward until promoted to move one space in any direction, four bishops, four knights, four rooks, two queens and one king, and players may place their pieces into their own formation before the game starts. When a division's king is captured, all other pieces from that division are removed from the battlefield. Pieces can move together as formations, which are connected by any compatible pieces that are adjacent or mutually supportive with one another, and capture pieces by broadsiding with walls of pieces or piercing inferior ranks with superior firepower. Pieces are mutually supportive if they are identical and are within reach of their move style; for example, two bishops are mutually supportive if they are on an adjacent diagonal path unobstructed by other pieces.
 Rollerball: Inspired by the sci-fi film of the same name, pieces move clockwise around a Roller Derby-like track. By Jean-Louis Cazaux (1998).
 Shafran's hexagonal chess: Chess on an irregular hex board of 70 cells. Same as Gliński's Hexagonal Chess, but differs by starting position, pawn first-move options, pawns capturing forward diagonally, and castling. Invented by Grigorevich Shafran (1939).
 : This variant is played on a 16×16 board. In addition to the standard black and white pieces, the board is also encircled by 80 other coloured pieces (10 colours of 8 pieces each). Coloured squares near the center of the board correspond to the coloured pieces around the board, and when a player's piece occupies a coloured square, that player gains control of the matching coloured pieces. If a piece on a coloured square is moved or captured, control of the matching pieces is lost (transferred to the other player in case of capture). Players may also switch the color of their initial army through "regime change". By Mark Bates.
Thrones Chess: Uses a board that combines a circular component and a square component, which allows long-range pieces to attack from three sides. The board is divided into two castles and a battlefield. A piece cannot cross more than two castle walls in the same move, and a king in check may not leave a castle except to capture the piece giving check. Knights have additional non-capturing moves. By Richard Van de Venter (1999). 
 : A variant inspired by the Trojan War played on a 91-cell hexagonal board. Pieces are named after characters from the myth.
 Zonal chess: Board has triangular wings or "zones" on either side of the main 8×8 board. Queens, bishops, and rooks that start from one of the squares in either zone may change direction and keep going on the same move. A queen, for example, could zig around an obstruction and attack a piece in the opposite zone. The power to change direction only applies when a piece's move starts from a zonal area. It is possible (using the queen and rook) to cross the board from one zone to another, but any piece entering a zone cannot make use of the extended move.

Variant rules, standard set of standard piece types, standard board
5D Chess with Multiverse Time Travel: Players can move their pieces through time and between timelines, interacting with the board as it existed earlier in the game, creating alternate timelines which pieces can be moved between. The game is won if at least one king from any time and timeline is in checkmate.
 Absorption chess (also called cannibal chess, power absorption chess, or seizer's chess): Pieces gain the abilities of the pieces they capture.
 Andernach chess: A piece making a capture changes colour.
 ASEAN chess: Pawns start on the 3rd ranks. Queens can only move 1 square diagonally and Bishops only 1 square diagonally or 1 square directly forward.
 Atomic chess: Capture on any square results in an "atomic explosion" which kills (i.e. removes from the game) all pieces in the eight surrounding squares, except for pawns.
 Beirut Chess: Players secretly equip one of their men with a "bomb", which can be detonated at any time, wiping out all pieces on surrounding squares. Win by checkmating the opponent, or blowing up their king. By Jim Winslow (1992).
 Benedict chess: Instead of capturing by displacement, players may convert an enemy piece they attack to their own color.
 Checkers chess: Pieces can only move forward until they have reached the far rank.
 Checkless chess: Players are forbidden from giving check except to checkmate.
 Chessplus: Commercial variant. Up to two of any friendly piece save the King may occupy the same single square. Either piece may choose to carry the other with it if or when it moves.
 Circe chess: Captured pieces are reborn on their starting squares.
 Crazyhouse: Captured pieces change colour to match the capturing player and can be returned to any unoccupied square on a later turn. There are two variations of this variant, known as Loop chess and Chessgi.
 Cubic Chess: Piece cubes display the six piece types; a player can promote any pawn by rotating its cube to match a captured piece type. By Vladimír Pribylinec (1977). 
 Dynamo Chess: Capturing is replaced by pushing or pulling enemy pieces off the board. By Hans Klüver and Peter Kahl (1968). A close variant of Push Chess (by Fred Galvin, 1967).
 Einstein chess: Pieces transform into more or less powerful pieces when they move.
 Extinction chess: To win, a player must capture all of any one type of pieces of the opponent (for example, all the knights an opponent has, or all their pawns, etc.).
 Gravity chess: After every turn, all pieces other than pawns fall towards the higher ranks of the board, until they either reach the eighth rank, or another piece or pawn in the way.
 Guard chess (or Icelandic chess): Allows captures only when a piece is completely unprotected by friendly pieces. Checkmate occurs when the piece forcing the mate is protected and therefore cannot be captured.
 Haft Schrödinger Chess: Every piece starts in a quantum superposition initially able to be any piece until the waveform is collapsed by observation. As in chess, Haft Schrödinger Chess does not have hidden information, whereas Schrödinger's Chess is regarded as a game of hidden information.
 Hierarchical chess: Pieces must be moved in the order: pawn, knight, bishop, rook, queen, king. A player who has the corresponding piece but cannot move it loses.
 Hostage chess: Captured pieces are held in the capturer's "prison", and can be released by the opponent and dropped into play (like shogi) via a "hostage exchange". By John Leslie (1997). 
 Jedi Knight chess: Knights may move three steps diagonally or horizontally or both, depending on the rules accepted.

 Jump chess: The rook, bishop and queen may move from one side of any piece (friend or foe) to the other side in their normal direction of movement. No change for the King and Knight. Jump move is exactly two squares, and can be used to give check or to capture. Jump moves are notated using '^'. In the starting position, 1.R^a3 and 1.B^a3 are both legal. By former Pentamind champion Alain Dekker (2004).
Kamikaze chess (or Hara-Kiri chess): When capturing, the capturing piece is removed from play also. This means a king cannot defend itself by capturing an attacker. A capture is not allowed if it exposes one's own king to discovered check. Idea from B. G. Laws (1928). The king is royal and removing a check takes precedence over capturing. The king must be lost last; moving into check is permitted after all other pieces have been captured.
 King of the Hill: In addition to checkmate, a legal move that moves one's own king to one of the center squares (d4, d5, e4, e5) wins. This is analogous to sannin shogi's rule that allows a player to win by legally moving their king to the center.
 Knightmare Chess: Played with cards that change the game rules. 
 Knight relay chess: Pieces defended by a friendly knight can move as a knight.

 Knightmate (or Mate The Knight): The goal is to checkmate the opponent's knight (initially on e-file). The kings on b- and g-files can be captured as other pieces. Pawns can promote to kings but not to knights. By Bruce Zimov (1972).
 Legan chess: Played as if the board would be rotated 45°, initial position and pawn movements are adjusted accordingly.
 Losing chess (or Antichess, Giveaway chess, Suicide chess, Killer chess, Take-all chess, Take-me chess, Reverse chess): Capturing moves are mandatory and the objective is to lose all one's pieces. There is no check; the king is captured like an ordinary piece.
 Madrasi chess (or Weird chess): A piece which is attacked by the same type of piece of the opposite color is paralysed.
 Monochromatic chess: All pieces must stay on the same color square as they initially begin.
 No-castling chess: standard rules except that castling is not allowed, which means king safety is reduced. Proposed in 2019 by Vladimir Kramnik with the aim of reducing draws and uninteresting games, and tested on Alpha Zero.
 Patrol chess: Captures and checks are only possible if the capturing or checking piece is guarded by a friendly piece.
 PlunderChess: The capturing piece is allowed to temporarily take the moving abilities of the piece taken.
 Pocket Knight Chess (or Tombola Chess): Players have an extra knight they keep at the side of the board. Once during the game, a player may place the knight on any empty square for their move. Play then proceeds as normal.

 Portal Chess: Any of a number of games that involve pieces or squares for teleportation around the board(s).
 Racing Kings: Players race kings to the 8th rank. Captures, but no checks or checkmate.
 Refusal chess (or Outlaw chess, Rejection chess): A played move can be refused by the opponent, forcing the first player to change to another move, which must be accepted.
 Replacement chess: Captured pieces are not removed from the board but relocated by the captor to any vacant square.
 Rifle chess (or Shooting chess, Sniper chess): When capturing, the capturing piece remains unmoved on its original square, instead of occupying the square of the piece captured.
 Stalemate-win chess: Normal chess, but stalemate is considered a win. 
 Three-check chess: Standard rules of chess apply, but a player can win by putting their opponent in check three times. In The Encyclopedia of Chess Variants, David Pritchard notes it being of probable Soviet origin, and that Anatoly Karpov was an "invincible" player in his youth.

Multimove variants
In these variants one or both players can move more than once per turn. The board and the pieces in these variants are the same as in standard chess.
 Avalanche chess: Each move consists of a standard chess move followed by a move of one of the opponent's pawns.
 Doublemove Chess: Similar to Marseillais chess, but with no en passant, check, or checkmate. The objective is to capture the king. By Fred Galvin (1957).
 Double-Take Chess: Each player, once per game, can make two moves during one of their turns. These two moves cannot be used to place the opponent's king in checkmate.
 Kung-fu chess: A variant without turns. Any player can move any of their pieces at any given moment.
 Marseillais chess (or Two-move chess): After the first turn of the game by White being a single move, each player moves twice per turn.
 Monster chess (or Super King): White has the king and four pawns against the entire black army but may make two successive moves per turn.
Multimove Chess (i, j): A class of chess variants where white gets i moves per turn and black gets j moves per turn. Check is not enforced, and victory is by capturing the enemy king. The games are described and analysed logically in a 2015 journal article. The authors weakly solved the game for all (i, j) pairs except for (1, 1) (functionally, regular chess) and (2, 2).
Progressive chess (or Scottish chess): White moves once, then Black moves twice, then White moves three times, and so on.
 Swarm chess: During each turn, each piece that a player can move they must move.

Chance and incomplete information
In contrast to classical chess which is a game of complete information, these either have elements of chance or players do not have perfect information as to the state of the board.

 ChessHeads: Played with cards that change the game rules.
 Choker: A combination of chess and poker, with players betting on cards made up from pieces of a standard chess set.
 Dark chess: The player sees only squares of the board that are attacked by their pieces.
 Dice chess: The pieces a player is able to move are determined by rolling a pair of dice.
 Fantasy Chess: Chess with wargaming added. Players fight for squares (which can be co-occupied) using dice. Can be expanded to four players; piece capability can improve each game.
 Kriegspiel: Neither player knows where the opponent's pieces are but can deduce them with information from a referee.
 No Stress Chess: Marketed for teaching beginners, the piece(s) a player is able to move are determined by drawing from a deck of cards, with each card providing the rules for how the piece may move. Castling and en passant are disallowed.
 Panic Chess: Player selects a piece to move, but the target square is randomized from all possible options. Captures are prioritized over non-capture moves. King, if no capture is possible, prioritizes a square not attacked by the opponent. Play ends with capture of king.
 Penultima: An inductive variant where the players must deduce hidden rules invented by "Spectators".
 Poisoned Pawn Chess: Each player secretly chooses one of their own non-central pawns to be "poisoned" for the length of the game. If a player captures their opponent's poisoned pawn with their own poisoned pawn, they win the game, but if they capture it with any other piece, they lose the game. Otherwise, standard chess rules apply. If a poisoned pawn is promoted, the piece it becomes behaves as a standard chess piece, with no variant conditions. An optional rule exists which states that a poisoned pawn may not capture any piece which is not their opponent's poisoned pawn. This variant was introduced by Samay Raina.
 Schrödinger's Chess: Players' minor pieces are concealed so the opponent does not know what they are until revealed. When covered, pieces move in a restricted way (as queens that can only move two squares).
 Synchronous Chess: Players try to outguess each other, moving simultaneously after privately recording intended moves and anticipated results. Incompatible moves, for instance to the same square with no anticipated capture, are replayed. Alternatively, two pieces moving to the same square are both captured, unless one is the king, in which case it captures the other. Play ends with capture of king.
 WeGo Chess: Like synchronous chess, but with added rules that avoid replay. Players move simultaneously after privately recording intended moves. A piece cannot be moved two turns in a row. Two pieces moving on the same line, but in opposite direction, are both captured if they end up on the same square or cross each other. It follows that two knights would avoid simultaneous capture. Play ends with capture of king.
 Viennese Chess: A barrier or screen between the two halves of the chessboard, two players then place their pieces on their half of the board. The barrier is then lifted and the game is then played as in orthodox chess.

Variant (fairy) pieces

Variant rules, pieces and board
 Bear chess — 10x10 chess variant, proposed by Mikhail Sosnovsky in 1985 in Kalinin. Board 10x10; extra pieces are Bears, which leap as N or two squares as R or B; baseline (a1-j1/a10-j10) RNBBeQKBeBNR. Pawns can move up to three squares initially (e.p. permitted). In castling, K moves to c/h files.
 Bomberman chess: Inspired by the Bomberman video game series. Played on a 10×8 board with special bomb and defuser pieces. The bomb can be exploded on its turn in vertical and horizontal directions (similar to the movement of a rook), destroying any pieces in the blast range. The defuser can capture a bomb.
 Chesquerque: Played on four Alquerque boards combined. Includes an extra pawn and archbishop per side. By George Dekle Sr. 	
 Chess on a Really Big Board: Played on a 16×16 board, with twelve piece types (six being the orthodox chess pieces). Has many subvariants, including a larger 24×24 version and a three-dimensional 16×16×16 version.
Dragonchess: Three 8x12 boards with some standard chess pieces and many other pieces, some of which move between the levels. Created by Gary Gygax.
: In addition to the usual pieces, the two players have joint control of a small rubber duck which acts as a “blocker” (i.e. nothing can move onto or through it), and which must be moved to a new square after every turn. The goal is to successfully capture the opponent’s king. A stalemated player wins.
Duell: Dice are used instead of pieces. Played on a 9×8 board.
Gess: Chess with variable pieces, played on a Go board.
 Jetan: A "Martian chess" invented by Edgar Rice Burroughs for his novel The Chessmen of Mars (1922), played on a 10×10 board. None of the pieces are orthodox chess pieces.
Metamachy: On a 12×12 board with 30 pieces each, 12 piece types (6 being the orthodox chess pieces) and 12 possible starting arrangements. New pieces are the cannon and the elephant (like in Shako), the prince (a non-royal king, can be promoted), the camel (long range leaper), the lion (any 1 or 2 squares) and the eagle (inspired by Tamerlane chess). By Jean-Louis Cazaux (2012).
 Omega chess: On a 10×10 board with four extra squares, one per corner. Includes the champion and wizard fairy pieces. Both are leapers, with different ways of leaping.
 Shako: Played on a 10×10 board. New pieces are the cannon from xiangqi (Chinese chess) and an elephant moving as a fers+alfil of old shatranj (ancestors of queen and bishop), so diagonally one or two squares with jumps allowed. By Jean Louis-Cazaux (1997).
 Stealth chess: Played in the fictional Ankh-Morpork Assassins' Guild from the Discworld series of books; played on an 8×10 board. The fairy piece is the Assassin.
 Stratomic: Adds nuclear missiles to the standard chess array on a 10×10 board. When launched they irradiate any 3×3 area (friendly pieces included) except kings. By Robert Montay-Marsais (1972). 
 Triangular Chess: Board comprises 96 triangles. The rook and bishop have three directions; the queen, six. Three extra pawns and a unicorn. By George Dekle Sr.
 Tri-Chess: A variation of Triangular Chess. The rook and bishop are increased to six directions; the queen, to twelve. By George Dekle Sr.
 2000 A.D.: Played on a 10×10 board, features the empress, capricorn, gorgon, chimaera, dragon, minotaur, unicorn, and fury fairy chess pieces. By V. R. Parton.
 Wildebeest Chess: Uses an 11×10 board, each player has two camels and a wildebeest (camel + knight). Pawns move one, two, or three squares initially. By R. Wayne Schmittberger (1987). 
 Wolf Chess: On an 8×10 board, with fairy pieces wolf (empress), fox (princess), nightrider, sergeant (almost a Berolina pawn), and elephant (amazon). By Arno von Wilpert (1943).

Movement in higher dimensions 

A number of variants have been developed where the playing area is in three dimensions or more. In most cases an extra spatial dimension is represented by multiple boards being laid next to each other. Some extra-dimensional variants attempt to reflect the 3D nature of modern warfare (e.g. Raumschach, designed to reflect aerial and submarine warfare), while others incorporate fantasy or science fiction ideas such as parallel worlds and time travel. An example of the latter is the variant introduced by the 2020 computer game 5D Chess with Multiverse Time Travel, which uses a varying number of boards all being played in parallel.

Fairy pieces on a standard board
Most of the pieces in these variants are borrowed from chess. The game goal and rules are also very similar to those in chess; however, these variants include one or more fairy pieces which move differently from chess pieces.

 Anti-King chess: Features an anti-king. The anti-king moves in the same way as a king. This piece is in check when not attacked. If a player's anti-king is in check and unable to move to a square attacked by the opponent, the player loses (checkmate). The anti-king cannot capture enemy pieces, but can capture friendly pieces. A king may not attack the opponent's anti-king. The anti-king may not check its own king. Other rules the same as in standard chess, including check and checkmate to the regular king. By Peter Aronson (2002).
 Baroque chess (or Ultima): Pieces on the first row move like queens, and pieces on the second row move like rooks. They are named after their unusual capturing methods. For example, leaper, immobilizer and coordinator.
 Berolina chess: Which uses the Berolina pawn instead of the normal pawn, all other things being equal.
 Chess with different armies: Two sides use different sets of fairy pieces. There are several armies of approximately equal strength to choose from including the standard FIDE chess army.
 Falcon-Hunter Chess: A falcon moves forward as a bishop; backward as a rook. The hunter moves forward as a rook; backward as a bishop. Players introduce the fairies as the game progresses. By Karl Schulz (1943).
 Grasshopper chess: The pawns can promote to grasshopper, or grasshoppers are on the board in the initial position.
 Pocket Mutation Chess: Player can put a piece temporarily into the pocket, optionally mutating it into another (including fairy) piece.
Super X Chess: Players can combine their own pieces by capturing them. King or queen can't combine. A combined piece has the ability to move as both pieces that got combined. Same kind of pieces can combine into new pieces. Pieces can't uncombine or combine again.  By Miika Pihkala (2018).
 Spartan chess: Black (the Spartans) has an army headed by two kings, which otherwise consists exclusively of unorthodox pieces, and battles the standard FIDE army (the Persians) of white.
 Torpedo chess: Which uses the torpedo pawn, which can move two squares forwards anywhere on the board, instead of the normal pawn, all other things being equal.
 Way of the Knight: Invented by Ralph Betza, incorporating two elements from tabletop role-playing games. Begins with the standard starting position and pieces, however through capturing and advancing up the board pieces can earn "experience", and a sufficiently experienced piece is upgraded to a more powerful one. Upgrades include various fairy pieces, and involve player choices of "alignment".

Empress, amazon, or princess pieces
There are a number of variants which use the empress (rook + knight) and princess (bishop + knight) compound pieces. The empress is also called marshall or chancellor. The princess is also called cardinal, archbishop, janus, paladin, or minister. Another compound piece is the amazon (queen + knight). To adapt to the new pieces, the board is usually extended to 10×8 or 10×10 with additional pawns added.

 Almost Chess: Uses an 8×8 board, with the conventional starting position, but queens are replaced by chancellors (empresses). By Ralph Betza (1977). A related variant is Sort of Almost Chess (Ralph Betza, 1994), where one player has a queen and the other has a chancellor.

 Capablanca Chess: A variant by the former world chess champion, José Raúl Capablanca. Played on a 10×8 board with chancellor (empress) and archbishop (princess).
 Capablanca Random Chess: Generalises all possible variants of Capablanca Chess with random starting positions following a method similar to that used in Chess960. By Reinhard Scharnagl (2004). 
 Embassy Chess: Uses a 10×8 board with Marshall (Empress) and Cardinal (Princess). The starting position is borrowed from Grand Chess. By Kevin Hill (2005).
 Gothic chess: A commercial variant played on a 10×8 board with Chancellor (Empress) and Archbishop (Princess).
 Grand Chess: Uses a 10×10 board with marshall (empress) and cardinal (princess). Invented by Christian Freeling (1984).
 Janus Chess: Uses a 10×8 board with two januses (princesses). By Werner Schöndorf (1978).
Gemini Chess: Uses a 10×8 board with two Archbishops. From an idea of Dr Zied Haddad in 2016. The difference from Janus Chess is the initial setup where the archbishops are sandwiching the queen and king remaining in the center of the board. 
 Maharajah and the Sepoys: Black has a complete army, and White only one piece: the maharajah (a royal amazon).
 Modern Chess: Played on a 9×9 board, with an extra pawn and a prime minister (princess). By Gabriel Vicente Maura (1968).
 Seirawan Chess: A commercial variant. Uses a standard 8×8 board with elephant (empress) and hawk (princess). By GM Yasser Seirawan and Bruce Harper (2007).
Musketeer Chess: A commercial variant, inspired from Seirawan Chess. This variant introduces 10 fairy pieces: archbishop, chancellor, hawk (different rules from Seirawan Chess), elephant (different rules from Seirawan Chess), leopard, cannon (different from Xiangqi), unicorn, fortress, spider, and amazon (also called dragon in this game). Players have a choice of 2 pieces among the 10 possible and method used to introduce them during the game.

Other fairy pieces
The pieces in these variants are borrowed from both chess and another game. The game goal and rules are either the same or very similar to those in chess. However, these variants include one or more fairy pieces which move differently from chess pieces.
 Chessers: Played on a regular chessboard but with checkers integrated with standard chess pieces. By Christopher Schwartz and Sander Beckers.
 Etchessera: Played on a regular chessboard but where players build their own chess army from a collection of 17 different pieces.
 Playing cards on a chessboard: A card game allowing open play on a board with rectangular sectors, just as in chess or checkers, but with the application of playing cards.
 Prince & Princess: The chess variant that uses the criterion of succession, where the king or queen are replaced in favor of the prince or the princess, created by Antonio Maravi Oyague.
 Proteus: A chess variant using dice to represent normal chess pieces, created by Steve Jackson Games.

Single-player variants

Similar to solitaire, there are a few chess variants for a single player. Unlike chess puzzles, these variants have a random starting position. Some of these are similar to permutation chess problems, for example the game Queen's Quadrille, which was invented by Karen Robinson in 1998. All chess pieces (except pawns) are randomly placed on a 4×4 board. Then one of the queens is removed and the game is started. Pieces move as usual, however capturing is not allowed. A player can move white and black pieces in any order, without regard for colour. The goal is to move the queen along a predetermined pattern; for example from one corner to the other, or visit all squares on the board only once. The same idea is found in the game Hippodrome, which was invented by Andy Lewicki in 2003. The initial position is obtained by placing four knights on the first row and all other pieces from a chess set (except pawns) on the remaining fields. Then one of the pieces (except knights) is removed and the game is started. The goal is to move all knights to the opposite rank.

In 1998 Robinson also invented a game which Hans Bodlaender named Chess Contradance, as the setup is like a contradance with the two lines facing each other.  The pieces are set up as in regular chess, but without pawns. The first and eighth ranks are safe havens, i.e., no piece can be captured on these ranks. The objective of the puzzle is to move the pieces such that all pieces move to the opposite back row without ever putting any piece in danger of being captured. Black and White alternate moves.

Variants for more than two people 

 Bosworth: A four-player variant played on 6×6 board. It uses a special card system with the pieces for spawning.
 Bughouse chess (or Exchange chess, Siamese chess, Swap chess, Tandem chess, Transfer Chess): Two teams of two players face each other on two boards. Allies use opposite colours and give captured pieces to their partner. The two-player version of the game, played with only one board, is Crazyhouse.
 Business chess: Played with two teams using normal chess playing rules but allowing up to five variations of the game. The team may discuss and play alternative moves freely.
 Djambi: Can be played by four players on a 9×9 board and four sets of special pieces. Pieces can capture or move those of an adversary. Captured pieces are not removed from the board, but turned upside down. There are variants for three or five players (Pentachiavel). (1975)
 Duchess: Notable for its wide variety of player counts; supports 2, 3, 4, or 6 players in a free-for-all, as well as 2v2, 2v2v2, or 3v3 team play. The board consists of one 4×5 "petal" for each player. These surround a core hexagonal board, which itself has two rings of squares around a central hexagonal "vortex" space. Three Fairy Chess pieces are used, the titular Duchess (princess), the Fortress (empress), and the Wizard, capable of teleporting friendly pieces.
 Enochian chess: A four-player variant with magical symbolism, associated with the Hermetic Order of the Golden Dawn.
 Forchess: A four-player variant using the standard board and two sets of standard pieces.
 Fortress chess: A four-player variant played in Russia in 18th and 19th centuries.
 Four-player chess (or  Four-handed, 4-Player): Can be played by four people and uses a special board and two sets of differently coloured pieces.
 Hand and brain: Teams of two play against each other; in each team, one player is the "brain" and calls out which piece to be moved, while the "hand" player chooses where to move it.
 Quatrochess: A four-player variant, in addition to the standard chess army, each side controls a chancellor, archbishop, mann, wazir, fers, two camels, and two giraffes. By George Dekle Sr.
 Three-Man Chess: Three chessboard halves fused into one, first to checkmate wins. By George Dekle Sr.
 Three-player chess: A family of variants specially designed for three players.
 Tri-Chess: For three players; 150 triangular cells; chancellor (empress) and cardinal (princess) replacing queen. By George Dekle Sr.

Games inspired by chess
These variants are very different from chess and may be classified as abstract strategy board games instead of chess variants.
 Arimaa: A game designed in 2002 to be easy for people to understand but difficult for computers to play well. The Arimaa Challenge was a cash prize offered for developing a program able to defeat the top human Arimaa players; this was claimed in 2015.
Hive: a bug-themed abstract strategy game designed by John Yianni and published in 2001 by Gen42 Games. The object of Hive is to capture the opponent's queen bee by completely surrounding it, while avoiding the capture of one's own queen.
 Martian chess: Played with Icehouse pieces.
 Navia Dratp: A cross between shogi and miniature wargaming.
 The Duke: An abstract strategy game where the board, pieces, and gameplay mechanics have some strong parallels with chess.

Chess-related historical and regional games
Some of these games have developed independently while others are ancestors or relatives of modern chess. The popularity of these variants may be limited to their respective places of origin (as is largely the case for shogi), or worldwide (as is the case for xiangqi). The games have their own institutions and traditions.

Historical

 Chaturaji: Four-handed version of chaturanga, played with dice.
 Chaturanga: An ancient East Indian game, presumed to be the common ancestor of chess and other national chess-related games.
 Courier chess: Played in Europe from 13th to 19th century. Probably was one step in evolving modern chess out of shatranj.
 Grant Acedrex: Medieval Spanish variant from 13th century.
 Shatranj: An ancient Persian game, derived from chaturanga.
 Short assize: Played in England and Paris in the second half of the 12th century.
 Tamerlane chess: A significantly expanded variation of shatranj.

Regional 

 Banqi (or Chinese Half chess) (China)
 Chandraki (Tibet)
 Game of the Three Kingdoms (China)
 Hiashatar (Mongolia)
Indian chess (India)
 Janggi (Korea; see also janggi variants)
 Jungle (or Dou Shou Qi, The Jungle Game, Jungle Chess, Animals Chess, Oriental Chess, Children's Chess) (China)
 Ka Ok (Cambodia)
 Main chator (Malaysia, Indonesia, Philippines)
 Makruk (Thailand)
 Ouk Chatrang (Cambodia)
 Rek Chess (Cambodia)
 Samantsy (Madagascar)
 Senterej (Ethiopia and Eritrea)
 Shatar (Mongolia)
 Shogi (Japan; see also shogi variants, especially chu shogi)
 Sittuyin (Burma)
 Xiangqi (China; see also xiangqi variants)

See also

 Advanced chess, Centaur chess or Cyborg chess
 Blindfold chess
 Correspondence chess
 Blitz chess
 Chess as mental training
 Chess boxing
 The Chess Variant Pages
 Fairy chess
 Fairy chess pieces
 Infinite chess (a class of chess games)
 Janggi variant
 List of abstract strategy games
 Outline of chess: Chess variants
 Shogi variant
 Xiangqi variant

Notes

References

Bibliography

Further reading

Shogi

Xiangqi

Others

External links

 British Chess Variants Society (archive)
 The Chess Family - History and Useful Information
 Chess Variant Applets Java Applets, which allow playing many chess variants against computer
 The Chess Variant Pages
 The Chess Variants wiki
 Comparison of Material Power in Variant Chess Games
 Variety and history of Chess in ancient world

 
Chess